The North London Literary Festival is an annual event held at Middlesex University and the surrounding areas of North London. The event is student-led in order for them to gain key experience, and the festival is free to access for students and the public.

History

Running annually since 1996, the festival aims to celebrate literary works through pop-up readings by students around North London, as well as guest speakers and workshops at the Hendon campus of Middlesex University.

Speakers

Previous speakers include Justin Cartwright, Philip Hensher, AL Kennedy, Linton Kwesi Johnson, Andrea Levy, Andrew Motion, Jan Pienkowski, Lord Puttnam and Fay Weldon.

Notable speakers include: David Nicholls, author of One Day and Galaxy Book of the Year winner, in 2014, and Dame Professor Carol Ann Duffy in 2015. In 2013,.
The festival secured a reading from horror novelist, James Herbert. Noted as a ‘rare appearance’, Herbert was set to discuss his latest work but unexpectedly died before the event.

The main three-day event is held in late March or early April each year. Aside from a number of notable speakers, the festival typically includes fiction and screen writing workshops, book signings and competitions.

References

Literary festivals in England
Middlesex University
Recurring events established in 1996